Michael Glover (1922–1990) served in the British army during the Second World War, after which he joined the British Council and became a professional author. He has written many articles and books on Napoleonic and Victorian warfare.

Published works
Glover has written the following published works:
 Britannia Sickens: Sir Arthur Wellesley and the Convention of Cintra, London: Leo Cooper, 1970.
 Legacy of Glory. The Bonaparte Kingdom of Spain, 1808-1813, London: Leo Cooper, 1972.
 Wellington as Military Commander, London: Sphere Books, 1973.
 The Peninsular War, 1807-1814: A Concise Military History, London: David & Charles; Hamden, Conn.: Archon Books, 1974.
 Rorke's Drift: A Victorian Epic, London: Cooper, 1975.
 General Burgoyne in Canada and America: Scapegoat for a System, London: Gordon & Cremonesi; [New York: Atheneum Publishers], 1976.
 A Very Slippery Fellow: The Life of Sir Robert Wilson 1777-1849, Oxford: OUP, 1978.
 The Napoleonic Wars: An Illustrated History, 1792-1815, London: Batsford, 1979.
 Warfare in the Age of Bonaparte, London: Cassell, c. 1980.
 The Fight for the Channel Ports: Calais to Brest 1940: A Study in Confusion, London: Leo Cooper, 1985.

Glover contributed additional text to the following published work:
 Pericoli, Ugo, 1815 - The Armies at Waterloo, additional text by Michael Glover; translations from the Italian by A. S. W. Winkworth; introduction by Elizabeth Longford, London: Seeley, 1973.

References

British military historians
1922 births
1990 deaths
Place of death missing
20th-century British historians
British Army personnel of World War II